This is a list of 218 species in Agapetus, a genus of little black caddisflies in the family Glossosomatidae.

Agapetus species

 Agapetus abbreviatus Ulmer, 1913 i c g
 Agapetus ablusus Neboiss, 1986 i c g
 Agapetus acuductus (Harris, 1828) i c g
 Agapetus adejensis Enderlein, 1929 i c g
 Agapetus agilis (Barnard, 1934) i c g
 Agapetus agtuuganonis Mey, 1997 i c g
 Agapetus aineias Malicky, 1997 i c g
 Agapetus ajpetriensis Martynov, 1916 i c g
 Agapetus alabamensis Harris, 1986 i c g
 Agapetus alarum Gibon, 2017 g
 Agapetus albomaculatus (Kimmins, 1953) i c g
 Agapetus aliceae Neboiss & Botosaneanu, 1988 i c g
 Agapetus altineri Sipahiler, 1989 i c g
 Agapetus anakdacing Malicky, 1995 i c g
 Agapetus anaksatu Malicky, 1995 i c g
 Agapetus anatolicus (Cakin, 1983) i c g
 Agapetus annulicornis Matsumura, 1931 i c g
 Agapetus antikena Schmid, 1959 i c g
 Agapetus antilochos Malicky, 1998 i c g
 Agapetus antiyaka Schmid, 1959 i c g
 Agapetus anuragoda Schmid, 1958 i c g
 Agapetus apalapsili (Malicky, 1978) i c g
 Agapetus arcita Denning, 1951 i c g
 Agapetus armatus (McLachlan, 1879) i c g
 Agapetus artesus Ross, 1938 i c g
 Agapetus arvernensis (Malicky, 1980) i c g
 Agapetus atuus Malicky & Chantaramongkol, 1992 i c g
 Agapetus avitus Edwards, 1956 i c g
 Agapetus ayodhia Schmid, 1958 i c g
 Agapetus azureus (Stephens, 1829) i c g
 Agapetus baptos Mey, 1998 i c g
 Agapetus barang Olah, 1988 i c g
 Agapetus basagureni Gonzalez & Botosaneanu, 1995 i c g
 Agapetus belarecus Botosaneanu, 1957 i c g
 Agapetus beredensis Dakki & Malicky, 1980 i c g
 Agapetus bidens McLachlan, 1875 i c g
 Agapetus bifidus Denning, 1949 i c g
 Agapetus birgi (Sipahiler, 1989) i c g
 Agapetus boulderensis Milne, 1936 i c g
 Agapetus budoensis Kobayashi, 1982 i c g
 Agapetus caimoc Olah, 1988 i c g
 Agapetus cannensis  g
 Agapetus cataractae Ulmer, 1951 i c g
 Agapetus caucasicus Martynov, 1913 i c g
 Agapetus celatus McLachlan, 1871 i c g
 Agapetus cenumarus Malicky & Chantaramongkol, 1992 i c g
 Agapetus chiangi  g
 Agapetus chinensis (Mosely, 1942) i c g
 Agapetus chitraliorum Schmid, 1959 i c g
 Agapetus christineae  g
 Agapetus clio (Malicky, 1976) i c g
 Agapetus cocandicus McLachlan, 1875 i c g
 Agapetus cornutus Denning, 1958 i c g
 Agapetus cralus (Mosely in Mosely & Kimmins, 1953) i c g
 Agapetus crasmus Ross, 1939 i c g
 Agapetus cravensis Giudicelli, 1973 i c g
 Agapetus curvidens Ulmer, 1930 i c g
 Agapetus cyrenensis Mosely, 1930 i c g
 Agapetus cyrnensis Mosely, 1930 g
 Agapetus dagunagari Malicky, 1995 i c g
 Agapetus dakkii Malicky & Lounaci, 1987 i c g
 Agapetus danbang Olah, 1988 i c g
 Agapetus dangorum Olah, 1988 i c g
 Agapetus dayi Ross, 1956 i c g
 Agapetus degrangei (Vaillant, 1967) i c g
 Agapetus delicatulus McLachlan, 1884 i c g
 Agapetus denningi Ross, 1951 i c g
 Agapetus dentatus (Kimmins, 1953) i c g
 Agapetus desom Olah, 1988 i c g
 Agapetus diacanthus Edwards, 1956 i c g
 Agapetus diversus (McLachlan, 1884) i c g
 Agapetus dolichopterus Giudicelli & Dakki, 1980 i c g
 Agapetus dubitans (McLachlan, 1879) i c g
 Agapetus dundungra  g
 Agapetus episkopi Malicky, 1972 i c g
 Agapetus eriopus Mey, 1996 i c g
 Agapetus esinertus Malicky & Chantaramongkol, 1992 i c g
 Agapetus evansi Ross, 1956 i c g
 Agapetus excisus Kimmins, 1953 i c g
 Agapetus foliatus (Kimmins, 1953) i c g
 Agapetus formosanus  g
 Agapetus fuscipes Curtis, 1834 i c g
 Agapetus fuscus Vaillant, 1954 i c g
 Agapetus gelbae Ross, 1947 i c g
 Agapetus gonophorus Mey, 1996 i c g
 Agapetus gorgitensis Sipahiler, 1996 i c g
 Agapetus gotgian Olah, 1988 i c g
 Agapetus grahami Ross, 1956 i c g
 Agapetus gunungus Neboiss & Botosaneanu, 1988 i c g
 Agapetus hadimensis Sipahiler, 1996 i c g
 Agapetus halong Olah, 1988 i c g
 Agapetus hamatus Ross, 1956 i c g
 Agapetus hanumata Schmid, 1958 i c g
 Agapetus hellenorum (Malicky, 1984) i c g
 Agapetus hessi Leonard & Leonard, 1949 i c g
 Agapetus hieianus (Tsuda, 1942) i c g
 Agapetus himalayanus (Martynov, 1935) i c
 Agapetus illini Ross, 1938 i c g
 Agapetus inaequispinosus Schmid, 1970 i c g
 Agapetus incertulus McLachlan, 1884 i c g
 Agapetus incurvatus (Kimmins, 1953) i c g
 Agapetus insons (McLachlan, 1879) i c g
 Agapetus iridipennis (McLachlan, 1879) i c g
 Agapetus iridis Ross, 1944 i c g
 Agapetus jafiwi Ross, 1951 i c g
 Agapetus jakutorum Martynov, 1934 i c g
 Agapetus japonicus (Tsuda, 1942) i c g
 Agapetus jiriensis Malicky, 1995 i c g
 Agapetus joannia Denning, 1965 i c g
 Agapetus jocassee Morse in Morse, Hamilton & Hoffman, 1989 i c g
 Agapetus karabagi Cakin, 1983 i c g
 Agapetus kashmirensis Kimmins, 1953 i c g
 Agapetus kimminsi Ross, 1956 i c g
 Agapetus kirgisorum Martynov, 1927 i c g
 Agapetus kithmalie (Chantaramongkol & Malicky, 1986) i c g
 Agapetus komanus (Tsuda, 1942) i c g
 Agapetus kongcanxing Olah, 1988 i c g
 Agapetus krawanyi (Ulmer, 1938) i c g
 Agapetus kumudumalie (Chantaramongkol & Malicky, 1986) i c g
 Agapetus lalus Malicky & Chantaramongkol, 1992 i c g
 Agapetus laniger Pictet, 1834 i c g
 Agapetus laparus Neboiss, 1977 i c g
 Agapetus latosus Ross, 1951 i c g
 Agapetus lepetimnos Malicky, 1976 i c g
 Agapetus limsusan Olah, 1993 i c g
 Agapetus lindus Neboiss & Botosaneanu, 1988 i c g
 Agapetus longipennis  g
 Agapetus loxozona Mey, 1997 i c g
 Agapetus lundbladi (Mosely, 1938) i c g
 Agapetus lusitanicus (Malicky, 1980) i c g
 Agapetus mahadhyandika (Schmid, 1959) i c g
 Agapetus maharikhita (Schmid, 1959) i c g
 Agapetus malleatus Banks, 1914 i c g
 Agapetus marlierorum (Botosaneanu, 1980) i c g
 Agapetus marlo Milne, 1936 i c g
 Agapetus medicus Ross, 1938 i c g
 Agapetus membrosus Ross, 1951 i c g
 Agapetus minutus Sibley, 1926 i c g
 Agapetus mitis (Kimmins, 1953) i c g
 Agapetus mittamitta  g
 Agapetus montanus Denning, 1949 i c g
 Agapetus monticolus Banks, 1939 i c g
 Agapetus moselyi (Ulmer, 1938) i c g
 Agapetus mossmanensis  g
 Agapetus muelleri  g
 Agapetus murinus (Barnard, 1934) i c g
 Agapetus neboissi  g
 Agapetus nimbulus McLachlan, 1879 i c g
 Agapetus nivodacus Ivanov, 1992 i c g
 Agapetus nokowoula Neboiss, 1986 i c g
 Agapetus numidicus Vaillant, 1954 i c g
 Agapetus oblongatus Martynov, 1913 i c g
 Agapetus obscurus Walker, 1852 i c g
 Agapetus occidentalis Denning, 1949 i c g
 Agapetus occidentis Denning, 1949 i c g
 Agapetus ochripes Curtis, 1834 i c g
 Agapetus ohiya Kimmins, 1953 i c g
 Agapetus oramatama (Malicky, 1978) i c g
 Agapetus orontes Malicky, 1980 i c g
 Agapetus orosus Denning, 1950 i c g
 Agapetus paluma  g
 Agapetus paracralus  g
 Agapetus pedarius Mey, 1997 i c g
 Agapetus pinatus Ross, 1938 i c g
 Agapetus placidus (Navas, 1918) i c g
 Agapetus pontona (Mosely in Mosely & Kimmins, 1953) i c g
 Agapetus productus (Kimmins, 1962) i c g
 Agapetus punctatus Hagen, 1859 i c g
 Agapetus punjabicus (Martynov, 1936) i c g
 Agapetus quadratus Mosely, 1930 i c g
 Agapetus quordus Malicky & Chantaramongkol, 1992 i c g
 Agapetus rama Schmid, 1958 i c g
 Agapetus ranohelae Gibon, 2017 g
 Agapetus rawana Schmid, 1958 i c g
 Agapetus rectigonopoda Botosaneanu, 1957 i c g
 Agapetus rossi Denning, 1941 i c g b
 Agapetus rudis Hagen, 1859 i c g
 Agapetus rupestris Mey, 1996 i c g
 Agapetus salomonis (Kimmins, 1957) i c g
 Agapetus sarayensis Sipahiler, 1996 i c g
 Agapetus segovicus Schmid, 1952 i c g
 Agapetus serotinus (Navas, 1919) i c g
 Agapetus setiferus Stephens, 1836 i c g
 Agapetus sexipalpus Jacquemart & Statzner, 1981 i c g
 Agapetus sheldoni  g
 Agapetus sibiricus Martynov, 1918 i c g
 Agapetus sindis Kimmins, 1953 i c g
 Agapetus sita Schmid, 1958 i c g
 Agapetus slavorum Botosaneanu, 1960 i c g
 Agapetus spinosus Etnier & Way, 1973 i c g
 Agapetus stclairae  g
 Agapetus tadzhikorum Ivanov, 1992 i c g
 Agapetus taho Ross, 1947 i c g
 Agapetus tamrangensis (Kimmins, 1964) i c g
 Agapetus tapaiacus Schmid, 1965 i c g
 Agapetus tasmanicus (Mosely in Mosely & Kimmins, 1953) i c g
 Agapetus tenuis  g
 Agapetus theischingeri Malicky, 1980 i c g
 Agapetus tomus Ross, 1941 i c g
 Agapetus torautus Neboiss & Botosaneanu, 1988 i c g
 Agapetus triangularis Martynov, 1935 i c g
 Agapetus tridens McLachlan, 1875 i c g
 Agapetus truncatus Martynov, 1913 i c g
 Agapetus tubrabucca  g
 Agapetus turcomanorum Schmid, 1959 i c g
 Agapetus uiguricus Mey, 1993 i c g
 Agapetus ulmeri Ross, 1951 i c g
 Agapetus ungulatus (Mosely, 1939) i c g
 Agapetus unicuspidalis (Mey, 1990) i c g
 Agapetus vercondarius Malicky & Chantaramongkol, 1992 i c g
 Agapetus vicanthicus Neboiss, 1988 i c g
 Agapetus vireo Ross, 1941 i c g
 Agapetus viricatus Malicky & Chantaramongkol, 1992 i c g
 Agapetus voccus Malicky & Chantaramongkol, 1992 i c g
 Agapetus walkeri (Betten & Mosely, 1940) i c g
 Agapetus yasensis (Tsuda, 1942) i c g
 Agapetus zniachtl Malicky, 1995 i c g
 Agapetus zwicki  g

Data sources: i = ITIS, c = Catalogue of Life, g = GBIF, b = Bugguide.net

References

Agapetus